Gregg Goslin was a member of the Cook County Board of Commissioners for the 14th district which includes parts of Barrington, Inverness, Palatine, Rolling Meadows, Arlington Heights, Wheeling, Northbrook, Northfield and Glenview.

Early life 
Goslin received his bachelor's degree in political science and secondary education from Southern Illinois University in 1975 and completed postgraduate study in real estate.

Early political career
In 1985, Goslin was elected the Township Supervisor for Northfield Township. He was elected in 1989 and 1993. He was elected Republican Committeemen for Northfield Township in 1994. During the 89th General Assembly, Republican incumbent Kevin Hanrahan resigned and Goslin was appointed to hold the seat for the remainder of his term in a caretaker capacity. The Republican candidate in the 1996 election, Elizabeth Coulson, succeeded him.

Cook County Commissioner 
Goslin was elected to the Board of Commissioners on November 3, 1998, to succeed Richard Siebel. He served for 20 years on the board before being defeated for reelection in November 2018 by Democrat Scott Britton. He was on multiple committees for both the Board of Commissioners and Forest Preserve District. In addition to his role as chairman of the Finance Committee for the Forest Preserve District of Cook County and chairman for the Botanic Garden committee, Goslin participated on the following committees:
 County Audit (Vice Chair)
 County Pension (Vice Chair)
 County Tax Delinquency (Vice Chair)
 County Criminal Justice
 County Finance
 Health and Hospitals
 County Homeland Security and Emergency Management
 County Law Enforcement
 County Legislation and Intergovernmental Relations
 County Roads & Bridges
 County Technology & Innovation
 County Zoning & Building
 FPD Audit
 FPD Capital Development
 FPD Law Enforcement
 FPD Legislation and Intergovernmental Relations
 FPD Real Estate
 FPD Recreation
 FPD Workers' Compensation
 FPD Zoological

Post political career
Currently, Goslin is active member of the Glenview Chamber of Commerce, Independence Day Celebration Commission, Glenview Optimist Club, Glenview Naval Air Station Rescue Task Force and a board member at Thomas Place Senior housing. He is also a former officer of the Northwest Municipal Conference.

References

External links
Gregg Goslin

Year of birth missing (living people)
Living people
Members of the Cook County Board of Commissioners
Members of the Illinois House of Representatives
Southern Illinois University alumni
People from Northfield, Illinois